Planorbula is a genus of gastropods belonging to the family Planorbidae.

The species of this genus are found in Northern America and Africa.

Species:

Planorbula armigera 
Planorbula campestris 
Planorbula durhami 
Planorbula mojavensis 
Planorbula nebrascensis 
Planorbula powelli

References

Gastropods